Men's Downhill World Cup 1990/1991

Calendar

Final point standings

In Men's Downhill World Cup 1990/91 all results count.

Men's Downhill Team Results

bold indicate highest score - italics indicate race wins

References

External links
 

World Cup
FIS Alpine Ski World Cup men's downhill discipline titles